Jeppe Pape Huldahl (born 7 February 1982) is a professional golfer from Denmark who currently plays on the Challenge Tour.

Huldahl was born in Holstebro, and lives in Copenhagen. He turned professional in 2003 and finished 4th at European Tour's final qualifying school at the end of the year to obtain his tour card. He had limited success in his first year on the European Tour in 2004 and stepped down to play on the second-tier Challenge Tour for the following season. He had limited success there too, until the 2008 season, when he won his tour event at the 2008 Lexus Open. He later had a runner-up finish at The Dutch Futures, and went on to finish 10th on the 2008 Challenge Tour's money list to regain his place on the top level tour for 2009.

After a quiet first half of the 2009 European Tour season, Huldahl was a surprise winner at the Celtic Manor Wales Open at the start of June in tough, wet conditions. He was a co-leader entering the final round and shot a final round 4-under par 67 to win by a single stroke over Sweden's Niclas Fasth. It was the third victory by a Dane on the European Tour in 2009, after Søren Kjeldsen won in Spain, and Sunshine Tour Order of Merit leader at the time Anders Hansen won in South Africa.

Amateur wins
2003 Danish Amateur Stroke Play Championship

Professional wins (5)

European Tour wins (1)

Challenge Tour wins (1)

Challenge Tour playoff record (0–2)

Nordic Golf League wins (3)

Results in World Golf Championships

"T" = Tied

Team appearances
Amateur
European Boys' Team Championship (representing Denmark): 1999
Eisenhower Trophy (representing Denmark): 2002
European Amateur Team Championship (representing Denmark): 2003

See also
2008 Challenge Tour graduates

References

External links

Danish male golfers
European Tour golfers
People from Holstebro
Sportspeople from Copenhagen
1982 births
Living people